This is a list of characters from the manga series Chainsaw Man by Tatsuki Fujimoto.

Protagonists
 / 

Denji is a young man with scruffy blond hair, sharp yellowish-brown eyes with bags underneath, and sharp teeth. As a young boy, he inherits his father's debt from the yakuza upon his father's death. After meeting the Chainsaw Devil, Pochita, he becomes a Devil Hunter in an attempt to clear his debt. When the yakuza make a deal with the Zombie Devil to kill him, Pochita fuses with his corpse, becoming his heart and setting a contract with Denji on the condition that he "share his dreams" with Pochita. After this, Denji revives and acquires the ability to transform into the devil-human hybrid known as Chainsaw Man by pulling a cord on his chest. After meeting Makima, he becomes a Public Safety Devil Hunter to live in humane conditions. His initial primary motivation is his love for Makima, but later his motivation shifts to using his newfound superhero fame as the Chainsaw Man to attract as many women as possible, repeatedly trying to expose his own identity, while also doing his best to care for Nayuta and to give her the family she always wanted. He acknowledges his bad luck with women, though, as nearly every woman he has met has tried to kill him. Currently he enrolls in Fourth East High School while taking care of Nayuta, the Control Devil's current incarnation.

A high school student attending Fourth East High School, the same school as Denji, who is estranged from her classmates. She initially finds the world to be corrupted and harbors a strong hatred for devils as a result of her parents being killed by the Typhoon Devil. She is generally unconfident and self-deprecating, but has a tendency to be judgmental or spiteful towards other people. Believing herself to be clumsy at all the worst times, she feels tremendous guilt for deaths she has inadvertently caused and has decided to close herself off from the world. After getting killed by the Class President who made a contract with the Justice Devil, she is revived by Yoru, becoming her vessel and a human-fiend hybrid while having the abilities of the War Devil. Now sharing the same body, Yoru forces Asa into her vendetta to eliminate Chainsaw Man and reclaim the Nuclear Weapons Devil from him, though her opinions on him remain neutral. Meeting with Denji, she considers him a loser and sees him as a potential weapon against Chainsaw Man (unaware of his true nature), but eventually she starts warming up and developing feelings for him. However Nayuta's interference and memory change cause her to believe she was stood up by Denji, and claims her feelings meant nothing and were only induced by spending time close to him in the aquarium. Asa also has a habit of seeking relationships and comfort due to her loneliness and crave for companionship, as proven for her feelings with Yoshida when he asks her to talk, only to find out that he only wanted to tell her to stay away from Denji without further explanations.

Four Horsemen
A group of powerful devils based on the Four Horsemen of the Apocalypse who can remember the existence of devils eaten by the Chainsaw Devil, who they battled a long time ago. They each harbor a motivation to kill or use the Chainsaw Man to fulfill their goals. According to Fami, the horsemen also might be related to each other, as she treats Yoru as a sibling.

The powerful devil that represents the fear of domination and/or conquest, and a member of the Four Horsemen Devils, who can control devils and humans alike, including their contracts and abilities.
 

A mysterious woman serving as the head of Public Safety Division 4, and the first person that shows affection to Denji. She is apparently kind and compassionate, but also cunning, intelligent and manipulative, as she controls Denji through his love for her to keep him working with Public Safety, while threatening to treat him as a Devil in case he tries to run away. She is later revealed to be the Control Devil, who seeks to use the Chainsaw Man to create a world without suffering. This goal, however, is not her true desire: as explained by Pochita, she always wanted to have a family, a relationship with someone who was equal to her, something that she could never achieve because of the way she was raised by the japanese government, who only saw her as a weapon. 
Her relationship with Denji is complex and nuanced: while she is after the power of the Chainsaw Devil, she also shows true affection to him throughout the story; from the first hug she gives him, to biting his finger so that he could always remember her, everything she does is both a part of her plan and a way to show him affection. After Denji defeats the Gun Devil possessing Aki's corpse, she grants him the wish she promised him in the beginning of the story: when she sees he only wants to be her dog, her disappointment lead her to break his contract with Pochita, as she believes he cannot be the Chainsaw Man that she needs; so she proceeds with her plan, by killing Power (that she previously called there to celebrate his birthday) and convincing him that she would always create and destroy every happiness he may find, also revealing that he was the one to kill his father, who did not commit suicide.
Only after the fight at the cemetery, when she fights with Pochita posing as Denji without recognizing him, insulting him without realizing that he is the original Chainsaw Devil, she realizes that she was wrong: Denji is the one that is able to defeat her, bypassing her contract with the prime minister by cutting her with a chainsaw made out of Power's blood while hiding between the other members of the Public Safety who followed her to the fight. Denji apologizes for what he has to do, then eats her as an act of love, declaring that he will always love her despite everything she has done. 
After a few days, Kishibe brings Denji a girl named Nayuta that he found in China, claiming that she is Makima's reincarnation, but also that she has no memories of her previous life. However, this is proven wrong by the same Nayuta biting Denji's finger as Makima did before, instantly recognizing him and calling him "doggy", claiming to love sliced bread and doing the same peace sign he did in her apartment, showing that she actually has memories from her past life and from her interactions with him, and also that she really cared about him. Despite Denji's assumptions, Makima was not deceived by the fact that she never really saw him, as she showed to have memorized his smell during their first meeting, separating it from Pochita's one: the true reason behind his plan's success was the fact that she was not able to accept that Pochita was different from what she had envisioned, and so ignored everything that could possibly lead to that conclusion. 

The current incarnation of the Control Devil following Makima's reincarnation. Resembling a young girl with black hair and the same ringed yellow-red eyes as Makima, she was found in China by Kishibe, who leaves her in Denji's care in order to raise her and keep her away from the japanese government. Nayuta's initial appearance is based on the titular character of Fujimoto's previous work .
After only a few months living with Denji, she is notably taller and visibly more mature then the first time she appeared; this is because as a Devil she grows much faster than a human; she is also precocious, as Denji believes she is smart enough to go to college, and is saving for her tuition. She also began to dress in a way that resembles Makima, with the same braided hairstyle as her previous incarnation. They live with Meowy and her 7 dogs, which she walks keeping their leashes attached to her waist, resembling the chains she used to control her subjects as Makima.
Nayuta shows a caring and protective attitude towards Denji, retaining her previous self's possessiveness and obsession with him: after seeing Denji getting kissed by Asa, she alters her memory in a fit of jealousy, claiming him as her property. It is revealed that despite remembering that he can't die, she doesn't want him to get close to other girls, as she somehow knows that the ones he has met before tried to kill him.
As Makima before, she exerts a certain degree of influence over Denji: this is shown when he tells her that she always comes first after Asa gets her memory altered, and also when he no longer wants to be Chainsaw Man (as she will always keep girls away from him) but she still manages to convince him otherwise by telling him he will get much more love if he keeps fighting Devils.
 / 
The once-powerful War Devil who goes into a contract with Asa after saving her from the Class President in contract with the Justice Devil. She represents the primal fear of war and a member of the Four Horsemen Devils, with the ability turn anything that "belongs" to the user into weapons, with more power in the weapon with the more guilt the user has in turning the item into a weapon, though her full extent of her abilities remain unknown. She took the name Yoru ("night") to mirror Asa ("day"). Yoru has become tremendously weakened after being largely consumed by Pochita, which became her main motive for her vendetta against Chainsaw Man. Unlike Makima who acts cold and untouchable, she acts more human and shows vulnerability, potentially from inheriting some of Asa's personality as a fiend. Before possessing Asa, she first appeared in a weakened form of an owl or potoo, similar to Pochita's dog form. After the aquarium date with Denji, Yoru revealed to Asa that she had inherited her crush on Denji, but it did not discourage her intentions to kill him.
 / 
The mysterious Famine Devil who takes on an identity of a female student in Fourth East High School and a member of the school's devil hunter club. She represents the fear of famine (and by extension, hunger) and a member of the Four Horsemen Devils who treats her fellow horsemen as sisters. Despite being a Horsemen and not openly reveal her true identity, she does not care if someone finds out, as she is not even hiding her true name, though she is currently monitored by Yoshida under the Public Safety orders. In contrast to the fear she represents, she is a massive glutton. Currently her goal remains unknown, aside from "assisting" Asa and Yoru on several occasions to their goal.

A Devil representing the fear of death. The Death Devil was mentioned by Makima, who aimed to eradicate the other Horsemen. Its status and whereabouts are unknown.

Public Safety Organization
The Public Safety Devil Hunters are an organization of government-sanctioned Devil Hunters in Japan who function similarly to a Fire Department or Police Force. They are sent to dispatch Devils in the event of a threat to the public and are tasked with resolving devil-related incidents on a smaller scale. They are divided into different "special divisions" with Tokyo Special Division 4 being an experimental division. There are divisions in Tokyo and Kyoto.

Devil Hunters

Tokyo 

A Public Safety Devil Hunter working under Makima's squad, Tokyo Special Division 4. He seeks revenge against the Gun Devil for killing his family. Aki originally had 2 contracts: one with the Fox Devil, allowing him to summon its head, and the other with the Curse Devil, using a lethal sword in exchange for his lifespan. He later makes a contract with the Future Devil, allowing him to see a few seconds into the future. Aki is stoic, mature and dependable, but has a soft side when alone or with his loved ones. He grows to greatly care about Denji and Power, despite clashing with them. He loses an arm in the fight with the Darkness Devil. Desperate to save Denji and Power from the horrible future the Future Devil warned him about, he makes one last contract with Makima as the Control Devil to counter the Gun Devil alongside Angel and the other deceased devil hunters, but is killed during the fight, and becomes the Gun Fiend. As the Gun Fiend, he perceives the destruction he causes as a harmless snowball fight, and Denji is forced to kill him.

The strongest devil hunter in the organization. Older than most other hunters, he is scarred and cynical. He trains Denji and Power, and was partnered with Quanxi in his youth, who constantly rejected his advances as he was unaware of her budding homosexuality. He secretly plots against Makima, who he has never trusted. He was in Tokyo Special Division 1 but was transferred to Special Division 4 and later led the Anti-Makima Squad to bring about her demise.

Aki's first partner, who has a crush on him, and a late member of Special Division 4. She wore an eyepatch and was contracted to the Ghost Devil, allowing her to use its invisible right hand from anywhere. While drunk, she gave Denji his first kiss, but ruined it by vomiting in his mouth. She was killed sacrificing her entire body to the Ghost Devil in order to protect Aki while fighting Samurai Sword.

A 20 year old woman with an unnamed contract, who started work as a devil hunter under Makima's experimental squad due to her parents forcing her to make money and support her other nine siblings. Despite her timid and cowardly attitude, she shows amazing speed, reflexes, and a talent for wielding knives. Following the International Assassins incident alongside the encounter with the Darkness Devil, she resigns from the organization and later works as a waitress for a fast food restaurant. However, she does encounter Denji again, who protects her from Makima. 

A devil hunter with a Fox Devil contract who was in the same squad as Himeno and Kobeni. He sacrificed himself to protect Kobeni from the yakuza who were hunting Denji.

A devil hunter in Tokyo Special Division 4. He was shot dead by lackeys of the Gun Devil.

A devil hunter in Tokyo Special Division 4. He survived the assassination attempt orchestrated by the Gun Devil and yakuza. Afterwards, he resigned as a Public Safety Devil Hunter, fearing for his life.

Kyoto

A devil hunter from Kyoto Division 1, whose life was ruined by the Gun Devil. She is transferred to Tokyo to help train the members of Tokyo Special Division 4. She was killed by American devil hunters with Yutaro and another devil hunter, Subaru, but later her corpse was used alongside her contract by Makima to counter the Gun Devil.

A devil hunter partnered with Michiko. He was killed by American devil hunters with Michiko and another devil hunter, Subaru, en route to Tokyo, but later his corpse was used alongside his contract by Makima to counter the Gun Devil.

Devils / Fiends

The Blood Fiend and a Public Safety Devil Hunter in Makima's squad. Power looks like a young girl with long hair; as a Fiend, she has short red horns protruding from her head (like a typical fiend). Power loves violence and is childish, greedy, almost entirely self-motivated, and willing to harm others for her own satisfaction. However, Power is shown to have an unconditional love for her cat, even at one point willing to sacrifice Denji's life to save it. She comes to care deeply for Denji and Aki, her first true friends. However, she was shot by Makima in front of Denji, to break his spirit. Power revives as the Blood Devil from Denji's blood at Pochita's request to save Denji, but is fatally wounded by Makima again. Before dying, Power makes a contract with Denji - in exchange for her blood, Denji has to find the reborn Blood Devil and turn her back into Power so they may be friends again.

 A humanoid Devil embodying the fear of angels. Appearing as an enigmatic androgynous young man with the ability to siphon off the lifespan of anyone who touches him, he holds no particular malice against humans and distances himself from others so as to not use his powers on them. He is partnered with Aki after Himeno's death and is regarded as the second-strongest Public Safety agent, but his laziness holds him back. He and Aki become closer after the latter willingly touches Angel to save his life. He loses both arms in the battle with the Darkness Devil. Before becoming a devil hunter, he lived happily in a village, but Makima arrived and manipulated him into killing the entire village to test his power. Regaining his lost memories, he tries to stop Makima, only for him to later be brainwashed and end up becoming one of her weapons for hunting Pochita.

 The wildly enthusiastic and unstable Shark Fiend, who can "swim" through solid objects and transform into a more monstrous shark-like form. He is partnered with Denji, whom he worships. He later sacrifices himself to revive Denji during the battle with the Darkness Devil in Hell.

 The friendly and polite Violence Fiend who ironically loves peace. He wears a plague doctor-like mask that dispenses poisonous gas to keep his immense strength under control. He still has most of his human brain and can remember several details about his past life, which is unusual for Fiends. He befriends Kobeni, but is killed during the battle with the Darkness Devil.

 The Spider Devil who takes a form of half human and spider with 8 legs. She embodies the fear of spiders. Most of the time, she seemed to only be taking orders from Makima.

Private Sector Organizations
Individuals who work on their own or in groups with private devil hunters. They are similar to bounty hunters and freelancers, meaning that they are not loyal nor officially employed by any government. Mostly in the series, many organizations tried to capture the Chainsaw Devil.

Japan
 
A Japanese private sector devil hunter/bodyguard hired to protect Denji while the international assassins hunt for Chainsaw Man, he has a contract with the Octopus Devil. He later turns up attending Fourth East High School with a task of keeping an eye on Denji to maintain a normal life, and is drawn into Asa's team for the Devil Hunter Club. At some point after the international assassins hunt, he also joins the Public Safety organization presumably under Kishibe's request to monitor Fami's behaviour. After telling Asa to stay away from Denji without further explaining his reasons, he asks Fami out to gather informations about the Nostradamus prophecy, threatening her to get the answers he needs.

Yakuza
 / Katana Man

The unnamed grandson of the yakuza boss who had Denji and Pochita killed, and a supposed agent of the Gun Devil. Like Denji, he is a human-devil hybrid with the heart of the Katana Devil, able to transform into his hybrid form by removing his hand. He was brought to the authorities after being defeated by Denji, but was later brainwashed by Makima alongside other hybrids to fight Denji. After Makima's defeat, his whereabouts are currently unknown.

A former Public Safety hunter who works with the yakuza by being Samurai Sword's handler. She has a contract with the Snake Devil, where she can summon it in exchange for one of her fingernails. After Samurai Sword's defeat, her devil automatically commits suicide with her per contract with the Gun Devil before being bought to the authorities, but later her corpse was used alongside her contract by Makima to counter the Gun Devil.

China

Kishibe's former partner and crush, a Chinese devil hunter and one of the assassins sent to steal Denji's heart. She is a lesbian in a polyamorous relationship with four female Fiends. She is a hybrid of the Crossbow Devil. According to Santa Claus, Quanxi is "the first devil hunter". She is beheaded by Makima, but later revived by her along with Reze and Samurai Sword to fight the Chainsaw Man. After Makima's defeat, her whereabouts are currently unknown.

One of Quanxi's girlfriend Fiends, she has horns similar to Power's and seems to have fire abilities, being able to breathe fire. She is killed during the battle with the Darkness Devil.

One of Quanxi's girlfriend Fiends, a very cheerful girl with a sentient creature acting as her ponytail, who sometimes shares useless facts, usually to try and impress Quanxi. She is killed during the battle with the Darkness Devil.

One of Quanxi's girlfriend Fiends, she has pale skin with stitches covering her face, thighs and upper arm, making her the most quiet among the group. She is later killed by Makima.

The Cosmos Fiend and one of Quanxi's girlfriend Fiends, whose brain is partially exposed and whose right eye hangs from its socket. She has the ability to show the complete knowledge of the universe to her targets, rendering them catatonic and unable to think of anything but Halloween. Her surface personality is presumably the result of her powers affecting herself, never speaking any words besides "Halloween". She is later killed by Makima.

Soviet Union

A young woman with a seemingly overt crush on Denji who works at a café. She is later revealed to be a hybrid with the Bomb Devil, able to transform by pulling a grenade pin on her neck, and a Soviet spy sent to kill Denji. Although she claims that her feelings towards him were all fabricated, her inner monologue revealed she initially took an interest in Denji because she empathized with him. On her way to seemingly escape with Denji after their fight, she is captured by the Angel Devil under control of Makima, who later uses her to fight Denji alongside the other brainwashed hybrids. After Makima's defeat, her whereabouts are currently unknown.

One of the assassins sent after Denji. Introduced as an elderly German man, it is revealed later on that Santa Claus is multiple people, the real body being a Russian woman referred to as "master" by her pupil Tolka, who she also turns into a body for her. The master has a contract with the Doll Devil, and has the ability to turn people into dolls under her control, which become part of the Santa Claus hivemind. She enacts a plot to send Denji and several hunters to Hell as sacrifices to the Darkness Devil in exchange for power to kill Makima. She is defeated by an on-fire Denji, and her mind is destroyed by Cosmo, leaving her incapacitated.

United States of America

A Private Sector devil hunter from the US who worked alongside his brother Joey and his unnamed elder brother, sharing a contract with the Skin Devil, which allows them to impersonate other people. After Santa Claus's defeat, he is the only brother who survived the incident, but seems to be infected with Cosmo's power. He is considerably more down-to-earth and cautious than his brothers, who are lecherous and vainglorious, considering themselves "immortal" due to being the sole survivors of their family, which was victimized by the Gun Devil's rampage.

A Private Sector devil hunter from the US who worked alongside his brother Aldo and his unnamed elder brother. He was killed by Hirofumi.
Elder brother of Joey and Aldo
The elder brother of Joey and Aldo, who seemed to be the most experienced and leader of the brothers. He was killed by Power when she commandeered Kobeni's car and accidently ran him (who was impersonating Subaru) and Denji down.

Fourth East High School
The biggest school in Tokyo attended by Denji and Asa.

Students

A high school student who paired up with Asa and Yoshida in the school's Devil Hunter Club. She quickly becomes best friends with Asa. After forming a contract with the Justice Devil, she gains the ability to read minds, though her personality becomes more psychopathic and cold, willing to kill innocents in the name of justice. After accidentally getting killed by Asa, she is revived by Fami, but her body becomes disfigured with the devil. She forbids farewell with Asa to see her distant relative devil hunter for help, but gets decapitated by a mysterious impostor posing as Chainsaw Man on the run.

The president of the Devil Hunter Club and leader of the student council who claims to be Chainsaw Man with a similar starter to Denji on his chest. It is revealed that the starter was actually surgically implanted, and he is an obsessed Chainsaw Man fan.

A member of the Devil Hunter Club who fights with spiked brass knuckles. He lost an eye in the fight against Yuko.
Class president
The unnamed former student council president of Fourth East, who killed Asa believing she was having a relationship with Tanaka, a teacher at their school. She had a contract with the Justice Devil, and was killed by Yoru.

Faculty and Staff

Asa's former homeroom teacher who was in a relationship with the Class President despite his crush to Asa. He was killed by Yoru upon her awakening by using his head and spine as a sword.

Devils
 / 

The Chainsaw Devil who merged with Denji, and was originally the Chainsaw Man himself prior to meeting Denji. He has the ability to eat a devil and erase their existence, making him "the Devil that Devils fear most". He first appears in his dog form, actually a weakened state after a fight with mysterious opponents. His true devil form is a large, darker version of Denji's hybrid form with four arms and one of his intestines wrapped around his neck, resembling a scarf.

One of the most powerful and feared Devils in the world. Thirteen years before the series' events, the Gun Devil manifested after a terrorist attack, and attacked the world, killing 1.2 million people in under five minutes before vanishing. It was later defeated and scattered into pieces by an unknown entity, and the governments of several countries have gathered these remains to form contracts with it. The president of the United States summons 20% of the Gun Devil to kill Makima. Makima defeats it, but it possesses Aki's body, turning into the Gun Fiend. It later dies at the hand of Denji, though the other 80% is still alive with its whereabouts unknown.

A devil embodying the fear of zombies who formed a contract with the yakuza and has Denji killed. Denji revives himself by transforming into his hybrid form and cuts the Zombie Devil in half, effectively killing it. However, it may have survived this attack, as its zombie creations continued to exist and were used by Samurai Sword and Akane to assault the Public Safety Division. Later, Makima summoned the Zombie Devil to turn Devil Hunters into zombies.

A devil embodies the fear of bats. He first appeared injured and taking Power's pet cat Meowy hostage in exchange for her bringing him humans to eat, only for him to later be killed by Denji. The next incarnation appears in a more wild state when chasing Asa and Yuko, later to be indirectly killed by Denji again while fighting the Cockroach Devil.

A devil embodying the fear of eternity. He took over Morin Hotel, trapping anyone who tries to enter in an endless eighth floor. Tokyo Special Division 4 was sent to retrieve a piece of the Gun Devil, which he had taken. After becoming unable to bear the pain of Denji repeatedly slashing him with his chainsaws, the Eternity Devil offered up its core to Denji, who killed him. The next incarnation takes over Tanashi Aquarium trapping Denji again with Asa on their date in a scheme by Fami to make her turn Denji into a weapon, but fails when Asa turned the entire Aquarium into a spear with Yoru using it to kill Eternity. 

A devil embodying the fear of curses. A person contracting the Curse Devil, upon stabbing their victim with a sword three times, can manifest the Curse Devil which will mortally crush its victim. However, using the Curse Devil's ability comes at the cost of several years of the contractor's lifespan. It had contracts with Aki and Santa Claus.

A devil embodying the fear of ghosts. It had a contract with Himeno that allowed her to grab objects with invisible arms, and manifested in sight to fight Samurai Sword after Himeno offered her entire body as payment. It was killed by Aki. 

A devil that embodies the fear of the future. He is a strong devil who can see the future of individuals he comes into contact with. He was captured by the Tokyo Public Safety Division and made a contract with Aki. Later, he reappeared to gloat to Denji, having already seen beforehand that Denji would kill Aki. Sometime later, he gets recaptured by the Public Safety in order to investigate the Nostradamus Porphecy by predicting the fate of the 30 convicts.

A devil embodying the fear of typhoons. The first incarnation of the Typhoon Devil killed Asa's parents and destroyed her home. The second incarnation appears to battle Denji with Reze, but is killed by Denji with Beam's help.

A devil embodying the fear of Hell. It can retrieve individuals on Earth and grab them with a giant, six-fingered hand emerging from the sky, carrying them into Hell through one the many doors overlapping Hell's sky.

An unfathomably powerful Devil representing the primal fear of darkness, residing in Hell. It traps Denji and a group of Devil Hunters when they are transported to Hell, instantly killing most of them.
 / 
The Chicken Devil that embodies the fear of chickens. He was Asa's class pet devil, who everyone learned to bond with as they learned to value life. Asa tried to carry him to join in at recess, but was tripped and fell on Bucky, killing him instantly. This became one of Asa's major factors on her guilt.

A Devil embodying the fear of justice. Anyone who makes a deal with the Justice Devil is able to turn their innate sense of justice into power. It resides in Fourth East High School making several contracts with students including Yuko, implying that it might be building an army by taking over the school.

A powerful devil representing the primal fear of falling, which appeared on Earth, attacking Asa and Yoru.

References

Chainsaw Man
Chainsaw Man